The Anacleto Formation is a geologic formation with outcrops in the Argentine Patagonian provinces of Mendoza, Río Negro, and Neuquén. It is the youngest formation within the Neuquén Group and belongs to the Río Colorado Subgroup. Formerly that subgroup was treated as a formation, and the Anacleto Formation was known as the Anacleto Member.

At its base, the Anacleto Formation conformably overlies the Bajo de la Carpa Formation, also of the Río Colorado Subgroup, and it is in turn unconformably overlain by the Allen Formation of the younger Malargüe Group.

Geodes are often found scattered throughout this formation.

Fossil content 

The following animals are known from bones found in the Anacleto Formation:
 several species of lizards
 several species of mammals

Crocodylomorphs

Dinosaurs

Ornithischians

Sauropods
Nests of dinosaur eggs, many with preserved embryos inside, have been discovered in large quantities at the famous Auca Mahuevo locality, and have been attributed to titanosaurs.

Theropods
The oldest known unequivocal bird footprints from South America were discovered in the Anacleto Formation. The small footprints were tentatively assigned to the ichnogenus Aquatilavipes and might have been produced by Patagopteryx (whose fossils were only found in the Bajo de la Carpa Formation however) or some unknown wader-like bird; they lack a hind toe. Ignotornis refers to similar footprints made by larger birds with a small hind toe; they might have been left by Neuquenornis, but this is also only known from the Bajo de la Carpa Formation. Footprints of these two ichnogenera have also been found elsewhere, but it must be understood that assignment to the same ichnogenus does not imply a close relatedness of the organisms that produced these traces, only a similar morphology.

Even smaller and somewhat unusual footprints assigned to Barrosopus are only known from the Anacleto Formation. They were almost certainly made by some tiny theropod, but whether this was a bird is not quite clear: the innermost front toes of the animal leaving these tracks attached in a position higher than the others. In that, and in their dimensions, they are a very close match for the odd-footed enantiornithine bird Yungavolucris brevipedalis, but this is only known from the Maastrichtian Lecho Formation which is some 10 million years younger.

Squamates

Testudines

See also 

 List of fossil sites
 Los Alamitos Formation
 Los Blanquitos Formation
 Adamantina Formation

References

Bibliography 
 Chiappe, Luis M. (1993): Enantiornithine (Aves) Tarsometatarsi from the Cretaceous Lecho Formation of Northwestern Argentina. American Museum Novitates 3083: 1-27. [English with Spanish abstract] PDF fulltext
 Coria, Rodolfo A.; Currie, Philip J.; Eberth, David & Garrido, Alberto (2002): Bird footprints from the Anacleto Formation (Late Cretaceous), Neuquén, Argentina. Ameghiniana 39(4): 453-463. [English with Spanish abstract] PDF fulltext
 
 
 Lockley, Martin; Matsukawa, Masaki; Ohira, Hiroto; Li, Jianjun; Wright, Joanna; White, Diane & Chen, Peiji (2006): Bird tracks from Liaoning Province, China: New insights into avian evolution during the Jurassic-Cretaceous transition. Cretaceous Research 27(1): 33-43.  (HTML abstract). Erratum: 
 Salgado, L.; Coria, R.A. & Chiappe, Luis M. (2005): Osteology of the sauropod embryos from the Upper Cretaceous of Patagonia. Acta Palaeontologica Polonica 50(1): 79–92. PDF fulltext

Further reading 
 S. Brizuela and A. Albino. 2011. A Scincomorpha lizard from the Campanian of Patagonia. Cretaceous Research 32:781-785
 I. A. Cerda. 2008. Gastroliths in an ornithopod dinosaur. Acta Palaeontologica Polonica 53(2):351-355
 L. M. Chiappe, R. A. Coria, L. Dingus, F. Jackson, A. Chinsamy and M. Fox. 1998. Sauropod dinosaur embryos from the Late Cretaceous of Patagonia. Nature 396:258-261
 R. A. Coria and L. M. Chiappe. 2000. Un nuevo terópodo abelisaurio de la Fm. Río Colorado (Cretácico Superior) de la Provincia del Neuquén [A new abelisaur theropod from the Río Colorado Fm. (Upper Cretaceous) of Neuquén province]. Actas XVI Jornadas Argentinas de Paleontología de Vertebrado, San Luis, Argentina 13
 L. S. Filippi and A. C. Garrido. 2012. Nuevo registro del género Dinilysia (Squamata, Serpentes) para la Formación Anacleto (Campaniano inferior-medio), Rincón de los Sauces, Neuquén, Argentina. Ameghiniana 49(1):132-136
 B. J. González Riga. 2011. Speeds and stance of titanosaur sauropods: analysis of Titanopodus tracks from the Late Cretaceous of Mendoza, Argentina. Anais da Academia Brasileira de Ciências 83(1):279-290
 A. M. Praderio, A. G. Martinelli, and C. R. A. Candeiro. 2008. Mesoeucrocodilos en el Cretácico de Malargüe: primer registro de Peirosaurus tormini (Crocodyliformes, Peirosauridae) para la provincia de Mendoza (Argentina). Actas del 4to. Encuentro Internacional del International Center of Earth Sciences (E-ICES-4), Malargüe, Mendoza 1-7
 L. Salgado, S. Apesteguía, and S. Heredia. 2005. A new specimen of Neuquensaurus australis, a Late Cretaceous saltasaurine titanosaur from North Patagonia. Journal of Vertebrate Paleontology 25(3):623-634
 L. Salgado, R. A. Coria, and S. E. Heredia. 1996. Nuevos materiales de ornitópodos (Ornithischia) en la Formación Rio Colorado (Cretácico Superior) de la Provincia de Rio Negro [New materials of ornithopods (Ornithischia) in the Rio Colorado Formation (Upper Cretaceous) of Rio Negro province]. Ameghiniana 33(4):471
 P. C. Sereno, R. N. Martínez, J. A. Wilson, D. J. Varricchio, O. A. Alcober and H. C. E. Larsson. 2008. Evidence for avian intrathoracic air sacs in a new predatory dinosaur from Argentina. PLoS ONE 3(9):e3303:1-20

 
Geologic formations of Argentina
Cretaceous Argentina
Mudstone formations
Sandstone formations
Limestone formations
Fluvial deposits
Lacustrine deposits
Cretaceous paleontological sites of South America